Senator Fine may refer to:

John Fine (politician) (1794–1867), New York State Senate
Sidney A. Fine (1903–1982), New York State Senate